French Guiana is not a separate territory but a region of France. France has a multi-party system, with numerous parties in which no one party often has a chance of gaining power alone, and parties must work with each other to form coalition governments.

For further details see the article: Politics of France.

The parties

Most of the French political parties are active in French Guiana.

In addition to these there are a number of regional parties:

 Decolonization and Social Emancipation Movement (Mouvement de Décolonisation et d'Émancipation Sociale, MDES)
 Guianese Socialist Party (Parti Socialiste Guyanais, PSG)
 Democratic Forces of Guiana (Forces démocratiques de Guyane, FDG)
 To the Left in Guiana (À gauche en Guyane, AGEG)(fr)
 Walwari

Since the December 2015 territorial elections, all the regional parties and the branches of the metropolitan parties hitherto represented in the former regional and general councils have been eliminated from the new Guianese Assembly. Only two lists, both labeled "miscellaneous left" (LDVG) by the Interior Ministry, concurred for the second round, none of them from a party or coalition of parties, both of them including unaffiliated candidates from left and right. Many local officeholders are also "miscellaneous left" or "miscellaneous right".

References

See also

 Lists of political parties

 
+Guiana
French Guiana
Political parties